Nandankanan may refer to: 
 Nandankanan, Chittagong, an area in the city of Chittagong, Bangladesh
 Nandankanan Zoological Park, in Bhubaneswar, Orissa, India